Matthew Ryan Macey (born 9 September 1994) is an English professional footballer who plays as a goalkeeper for EFL League One club Portsmouth on loan from Championship club Luton Town.

Career

Early career
Macey started to play youth football for Avon Arsenal Comets. In 2007, he applied but was rejected from Bristol Rovers' Centre of Excellence. Macey was also invited to train with Cardiff City but felt the travel commitment was too much. He then later went on to represent the youth teams of Bath City and Yate Town before Bristol Rovers signed him in 2009 before signing him as a full-time scholar in 2011. He first appeared in the Bristol Rovers squad for their League Two fixture against Torquay United in March 2012 but never made a first-team appearance for Bristol Rovers. He was however a part of their under-18 double-winning team. Macey was offered a professional contract at the end of the second year of his scholarship in the summer of 2013.

Arsenal and loan spells
On 23 October 2013, Macey signed for Arsenal after a trial with them. Arsenal beat off competition from Everton and a number of Championship clubs to sign Macey from Bristol Rovers. Due to his age, Arsenal also reportedly paid Bristol Rovers £100,000 in compensation for Macey after he had rejected an offer of a new contract at Bristol Rovers. In his first season at Arsenal, he was suggested as an immediate replacement for Łukasz Fabiański. In 2014, Macey was chosen to travel with Arsenal's first-team to a pre-season training camp in Austria and was later selected as a substitute for Arsenal's Premier League match against West Bromwich Albion.

On 8 January 2015, Macey signed for League Two club Accrington Stanley on a one-month loan. He made his Football League debut in a 3–0 defeat away to Tranmere Rovers on 17 January. Macey made his final appearance for Accrington in a 5–1 home defeat to Northampton Town on 31 January, and finished the loan with four appearances.

On 31 January 2017, Macey joined League Two club Luton Town on loan until the end of 2016–17. He debuted on 7 February in an EFL Trophy quarter-final tie against Yeovil Town, which Luton won 5–2. Macey went on to make his league debut four days later in a 2–1 win at home to Crawley Town. Macey was recalled by Arsenal on 5 April to provide cover for first-choice goalkeeper Petr Čech and second-choice goalkeeper David Ospina who were sidelined with a groin strain and an abdominal injury respectively, having made 13 appearances for Luton.

Macey made his debut for Arsenal on 24 October 2017 against Norwich City in the EFL Cup fourth round, with the match finishing a 2–1 victory after extra time. He made his European debut in the UEFA Europa League group stage nine days later, keeping a clean sheet in a 0–0 home draw against Red Star Belgrade. Macey signed a new contract of undisclosed length with Arsenal on 6 December.

Macey joined League One club Plymouth Argyle on 30 July 2018 on a season-long loan to replace the injured Harry Burgoyne. He made his debut in a 2–1 away defeat to Walsall five days later on the opening day of 2018–19. Macey was an ever-present in the team until he suffered a dead leg in a 2–1 defeat away to AFC Wimbledon on 26 December, and was deputised by Kyle Letheren in his absence.

Macey won the FA Cup by merit of being part of the Arsenal squad for the final against Chelsea on 1 August 2020.

Hibernian
On 8 January 2021, Macey left Arsenal to join Scottish club Hibernian until the end of the season. On 11 January, he made his debut in a 1–1 draw against Celtic in the Scottish Premiership. Macey played mainly in Scottish Cup matches for Hibernian during the rest of the season, and in May 2021 he signed a two-year contract with the club. He saved a penalty in the 2021 Scottish Cup Final, which Hibs lost 1–0 to St Johnstone.

Luton Town 
On 22 June 2022, Macey returned to Championship club Luton Town on a permanent basis, for an undisclosed fee.

Portsmouth 

On 20 January 2023, Portsmouth announced the signing of Macey on loan for the remainder of the season.

Career statistics

Honours
Arsenal
FA Cup: 2019–20

References

External links

1994 births
Living people
Sportspeople from Bath, Somerset
English footballers
Association football goalkeepers
Bristol Rovers F.C. players
Arsenal F.C. players
Accrington Stanley F.C. players
Luton Town F.C. players
Plymouth Argyle F.C. players
Hibernian F.C. players
English Football League players
Scottish Professional Football League players